Bosan Station is a subway station located at Dongducheon, Gyeonggi-do, South Korea. This station is on the Seoul Subway Line 1. Camp Casey, an American military base, is located nearby.

Platforms
 Platform 1: to Uijeongbu / Seoul Station / Incheon
 Platform 2: to Soyosan / Dongducheon

Exits
 Exit 1: Bosan Elementary School, Bosan-dong Community Center, Boyoung Girls' Middle School, Sangpaegyo
 Exit 2: Bosan-dong, Bosan Gwangwangteukgu, Korea-USA Friendship Plaza, Bosan Sageori, Dongducheon Post Office, Dongducheon Girls' Middle School, Boyoung Girls' High School, Boyoung Girls' Middle School

References 

Seoul Metropolitan Subway stations
Railway stations opened in 2006
Metro stations in Dongducheon
Seoul Subway Line 1